Absent at the inaugural Paralympic Games in 1960 in Rome, Japan made its Paralympic début by hosting the 1964 Games in Tokyo. The country has participated in every subsequent edition of the Summer Paralympics, and in every edition of the Winter Paralympics since the first in 1976. It has hosted the Paralympic Games twice, with Tokyo hosting the 1964 Summer Games, and Nagano the 1998 Winter Paralympics.The next Summer Paralympics in 2020 was held again in Tokyo. Japan is represented by the Japan Paralympic Committee.

Japan was the only Asian country to compete at the 1964 Paralympics, and also the only Asian country present at the inaugural Winter Games, making it the first Asian nation to have participated in either Summer or Winter Games. It is also the second most successful Asian country overall (behind China), having won 395 Paralympic medals, of which 118 gold, 134 silver and 143 bronze. This result places it 17th on the all-time Paralympic Games medal table.

Japan won only a single gold medal at the Tokyo Games (in the men's doubles, category C, in table tennis), but rapidly improved, with two gold in 1968, four in 1972, and ten in 1976, with a peak at eighteen in 2004 - though that number dropped to just five in 2008. In the Winter Games, the country emerged as a notable competitor when it hosted the Nagano Games in 1998, winning twelve gold medals - compared to none at all in previous editions.

By far Japan's most successful Paralympian has been swimmer Mayumi Narita, who won fifteen gold medals for her country between 1996 and 2004, making her one of the world's most successful Paralympians of all time.

Hosted Games
Japan have hosted the Games on three occasions, including the 2020 Summer Paralympics (which was postponed to 2021 due to the COVID-19 pandemic):

Unsuccessful bids

Medals

Medals by Summer Games

Medals by Winter Games

Medals by sports

Medals by summer sport

Medals by winter sport

See also
Japan at the Olympics

References